Samosdelka is a rural locality (a selo) and the administrative center of Samosdelsky Selsoviet, Kamyzyaksky District, Astrakhan Oblast, Russia. The population was 1,240 as of 2010. There are 14 streets.

Geography 
Samosdelka is located 34 km southwest of Kamyzyak (the district's administrative centre) by road. Forpost is the nearest rural locality.

References 

Rural localities in Kamyzyaksky District